The invasion of Hvaler was a Swedish military invasion  during the Swedish-Norwegian War of 1814.

The invasion was directed at the Norwegian archipelago of Hvaler in the southwestern part of Østfold, Norway. The invasion went off rather peacefully. The hostilities opened on 26 July with a swift Swedish naval attack against the Norwegian gunboats at Hvaler. Bad weather had delayed the Swedish archipelago fleet and troop transports, which gave the Norwegian fleet and army time to evacuate the island. The Norwegian vessels managed to escape northward to Tønsberg on the western side of the Oslofjord despite all Swedish attempts to halt the retreat. The vessels in the Swedish archipelago fleet were heavier than their Norwegian counterparts and not could catch up with the retiring Norwegian naval fleet.

Notes

References

Further reading
 

1814 in Sweden
1814 in Norway
Invasions of Norway
Invasions by Sweden
Conflicts in 1814
Swedish–Norwegian War (1814)
July 1814 events